Stohl András (born February 23, 1967) is a Hungarian actor.

Career
Stohl graduated from the Academy of Drama and Film in Budapest in 1990. He became a member of the Katona József Theatre in Budapest. In 2001 he became a freelancer, after the leadership of the theater decided that his work on television was irreconcilable with the theatre's artistic concept. Since 2003 he is a member of the Hungarian National Theatre.

Selected filmography
 Itt a szabadság! (1991)
 Perlasca – Un eroe Italiano (2002)

References

External links

1967 births
Hungarian male stage actors
Living people
Hungarian male television actors
Hungarian male film actors
Hungarian male voice actors
People from Pest County